A trophy truck, also known as a Baja truck or trick truck, is a vehicle used in high-speed off-road racing. This is an open production class and all components are considered legal unless specifically restricted.

Although any truck that meets the safety standards can race the trophy truck class, they, for the most part, feature long travel suspensions and high power engines. They are intended for desert racing only, and are not street legal. These vehicles are properly known as "trophy trucks" when raced in SCORE International sanctioned races, and "trick trucks" when raced in Best in the Desert sanctioned races. 

Since the class was introduced in 1994, the development of the trophy truck has been rapid. Prior to that date, SCORE's Class-8 rules dictated that the entrants must use a production frame. The introduction of the trophy truck class brought with it new freedom for competitors with minimal rules in its construction. Intense development in full-tube chassis and suspension travel led to previously unseen performance and speed.

History 
With no proven formula, the initial trophy truck designs were very varied, usually with no two trucks the same. Over a development process of ten years, eventually engineering firms like Geiser Brothers, Jimco, Racer Engineering, and ID Designs became known for producing successful trucks. In recent years new truck builders such as TSCO Racing, and Mason Motorsports Inc., have produced very advanced machines with many top racers seeing successful finishing results.

Truck design

Trophy trucks have been traditionally two-wheel drive but recent developments have seen more than one truck builder implementing all-wheel drive equipment. Lately the top teams have been moving toward AWD designs. Most feature a 4130 chromoly steel tube-frame chassis covered by an aerodynamically engineered composite body. All trucks are equipped with a steel tube roll cage. The SCORE International Rule Book defines and specifies the trophy truck requirements.

Gasoline engines are naturally aspirated, and typically Ford or Chevrolet V8 engines, generating in excess of 1100 BHP and 950lb-ft of torque. Turbo charged diesel motors are allowed, with a minimum size of 5.0 liters to a maximum size of 6.6 liters, with two turbo chargers. Turbo engines must be fitted with an air restrictor.

Most trophy trucks use independent A-arm suspensions up front. In the rear, most trucks feature a three or four-link setup with a solid rear axle, while some use various types of independent suspension. Suspension and damping duties are handled by one or two shock absorbers per wheel, usually consisting of one coil-over and one by-pass shock. Fox Racing Shox, Bilstein, and King Shocks are popular among competitors. 

Trophy trucks usually carry two spare tires in case of puncture. Total wet weight is around  minimum, with the mass necessary to absorb the rougher terrain in desert racing.

Transmission is a choice of either three-speed automatic or six-speed sequential gearbox. The three-speed TH400 gearbox predates the Baja 1000 but remains popular among competitors due to the long gear ratios and capability of handling the torque spikes caused by off-road racing. The six-speed sequential gearbox appeals to competitors due to the ease of changing gear ratios quickly.

See also
 Beach racing
 Desert racing
 Monster truck
 Off-road racing
 Pickup truck racing
 Short course off-road racing, a form of off-road racing using vehicles similar to trophy trucks
 Truck racing

References

External links 

 Official SCORE International website

Articles containing video clips
Off-road racing
Off-road vehicles
Racing car classes